The National Museum of Namibia is a historical and zoological museum in Windhoek, the capital of Namibia. It is governed by the Ministry of Education, Arts and Culture of the Namibian government.

Location and description

The National Museum is accommodated at three different places in central Windhoek. The Owela Display Centre (after the Owela board game) houses the zoological and general scientific collection. It is located in Lüderitz Street, sharing a building with the Windhoek Public Library.  the 1958 building is dilapidated, and the Owela museum is closed. 

The Alte Feste Museum houses the historic collection. It is accommodated at the Alte Feste building in Robert Mugabe Avenue, next to the Independence Memorial Museum. Administration of the National Museum and the National Museum Library, established in 1963, are situated also on Robert Mugabe Avenue, opposite the Alte Feste.  Alte Feste is closed and in urgent need of renovation. It is planned to repurpose the building into a centre of arts, craft, and heritage.

History
A museum was established by the Imperial German administration of German South West Africa in 1907. It was called the Landesmuseum. In 1925, with the territory now under South African administration, the museum was renamed the South West Africa museum. Responsibility of the museum was transferred to the South African government of South West Africa in 1957, and the name changed to State museum. After Namibian independence in 1990 it was administered by the Government of Namibia, and in 1994 the name was changed to National Museum of Namibia.

References

Notes

Further reading
 Antje Otto-Reiner: From Landesmuseum to National Museum of Namibia. The National Museum of Namibia, Windhoek 2007.

Museums in Namibia
Libraries in Namibia
Tourist attractions in Namibia
Buildings and structures in Windhoek
Museums established in 1907
1907 establishments in German South West Africa